Marina Schuck is a German sprint canoer who has competed since the late 2000s. She won a bronze medal in the K-4 1000 m event at the 2007 ICF Canoe Sprint World Championships in Duisburg.

References

German female canoeists
Living people
Year of birth missing (living people)
ICF Canoe Sprint World Championships medalists in kayak